Geoagiu is a town in Hunedoara County, in the historical region of Transylvania, Romania, located on the Mureș River at an altitude of 217 metres above sea level. The river with the same name (Geoagiu) flows in this place into the Mureș. The town has a population of 5,049. It administers ten villages: Aurel Vlaicu (until 1925 Binținți; Bencenc), Băcâia (Bakonya), Bozeș (Bózes), Cigmău (Csigmó), Gelmar (Gyalmár), Geoagiu-Băi (Feredőgyógy), Homorod (Homoród), Mermezeu-Văleni (Nyírmező), Renghet (Renget) and Văleni (Valény).

History

The first settlements in the area can be found in the time of the Dacians, in the 1st century BC, as shown by archeological discoveries. After the Roman conquest, the Romans built the fort of Germisara in the 2nd century, however, it kept the original Dacian name. Germisara was defended by the Legio XIII Gemina.

The name of Germisara meant "hot water" (germi = "heat", sara = "waterfall") and it showed that the Dacians already knew of the thermal springs of the area. Another opinion that the name came from the Hungarian name of the Geoagiu River (Gyógy), which means "curative". But more probably, the name is coming from the Hungarian word dió (nut as fruit) with the suffix -d, so, after the first documentary citation, "villa Gyog" from 1291 appeared as Dyod és Dyog (1397), Aldyogh (1407), Algyogh (1412), Aldyod (1439), Alsodyod alio nomine Alsoffalwa (around 1444).

The first documentary citation of Geoagiu (it was written as "villa Gyog") was in the year 1291, when it was used as a land in the vicinity of Bintinti (now the village Aurel Vlaicu). At the 2011 census, 89.7% of inhabitants were Romanians, 8.81% Roma and 0.71% Hungarians.

There are remains of the old Roman way made of plate stones from Geoagiu to Geoagiu Băi. The city days are on August 14–17.

Natives
 Ion Budai-Deleanu
 Aurel Vlaicu

See also
 Germisara (castra)

References

Towns in Romania
Populated places in Hunedoara County
Spa towns in Romania
Dacian towns
Localities in Transylvania